Jacky Daydream is an autobiographical book about Jacqueline Wilson's childhood, first published in 2007.

The book's title refers to a nickname given to the author when she was at school. The teacher, Mr Branson (who the children nicknamed Brandy Balls) would give all the children nicknames according to their character; initially he rather cruelly dubbed her "Jacky Four-eyes" when she came to school in glasses, subsequently he named her "Jacky Daydream" for staring out of the window during maths, a subject she hated.

The book details her very early life, from babyhood to the summer she was 11, when she is about to start at secondary school. The book is interspersed with many photos of the author at that time in her life. She also tells the reader what inspired her to write certain books, and she ends each chapter with a question that the reader must answer; for instance "Who had a doll named Bluebell and an imaginary Rottweiler?" Then she will give the answer.

She also gives a rather uncomfortable account of her constantly warring parents, Biddy and Harry. The book reveals that she failed the 11-plus the first time she sat the exams, as she had a terrible cold. She passed it a second time.

Jacqueline also writes about her favourite books, her first TV, her first china doll, who was apparently unwieldy, her parents' marriage, her first boyfriend David and many more facts about her life. Jac writes with love about her maternal grand parents, Ga and Gongon (nicknamed by Jacky before she could speak properly).

She has stated that from an early age she was determined to deal with "real" issues that affect children, and not to write Enid Blyton-style stories, although she greatly admired them.
She was also a great fan of the child actress Mandy Miller, who was about a year older.
She frequently talks about her favourite books and dolls she played with when she was a child. She is still an avid collector of both books and dolls and she also still enjoys reading and writing.

2007 non-fiction books
British autobiographies
Works by Jacqueline Wilson
Doubleday (publisher) books